Komering may be,

Komering River
Komering language
Komering People